Elliot Castro (born 1982) is a Scottish fraud prevention consultant and ex-fraudster from Glasgow who claims he swindled approximately $2.8 million through various financial crimes when he was a teenager.

Career
Castro claims that his first brush with criminality was when he, as a teenager, found a credit card on a train platform and used it for his train fare but was caught when the police boarded the train.

Castro claims that this criminal behaviour was ramped up when at 16 years old he lied about his age on a job application for a mobile phone company, stating he was 18. He was soon hired and began stealing personal information from clients, using information held by the company to defraud clients by tricking their banks to send new bank cards to different addresses where he would receive them and use them for his own gains.

At first, he would buy CDs, haircuts and clothes before realizing the potential of what he could do. He began spending lavishly as his crimes escalated. He purchased cars, a $12,000 Rolex, spent upwards of $15,000 at nightclubs and traveled the world. Castro claims to have travelled to every country in Europe with the money from his victims. He was briefly jailed in Canada and stole the credit card of the Canadian Immigration Office to book a flight back to Glasgow.

After returning to England at the age of 22, he was jailed for two years. After prison, he stopped defrauding people and began working legitimately as fraud prevention consultant for several firms.

See also 
 Frank Abagnale

References

External links
 

20th-century Scottish criminals
21st-century Scottish criminals
Living people
Date of birth missing (living people)
Impostors
Criminals from Glasgow
Scottish fraudsters
Scottish male criminals
Scottish white-collar criminals
1982 births